The 1991 Portuguese Grand Prix was a Formula One motor race held at the Autódromo do Estoril on 22 September 1991. It was the thirteenth race of the 1991 Formula One World Championship.

The 71-lap race was won by Italian driver Riccardo Patrese, driving a Williams-Renault, after he started from pole position. Patrese's teammate and Drivers' Championship challenger, Briton Nigel Mansell, led until a pit stop went wrong, resulting in his disqualification from the race. Brazilian Ayrton Senna finished second in a McLaren-Honda, thus increasing his lead over Mansell in the championship to 24 points with three races remaining, with Frenchman Jean Alesi finishing third in a Ferrari.

Pre-race
The only change to the driver line-up was that Johnny Herbert was back at Lotus, replacing Michael Bartels, who had failed to qualify in his three outings for the team.

Qualifying

Pre-qualifying report
It was the fourth consecutive 1–2 for the Brabham team in Friday morning pre-qualifying, with Martin Brundle outpacing his team-mate Mark Blundell by just 0.049 of a second. Third was Gabriele Tarquini in the AGS, just under three tenths of a second off the pace in the new JH27. The Footwork of Michele Alboreto was fourth, the Italian's fourth pre-qualifying success in five attempts.

The four drivers to miss out included Tarquini's team-mate Fabrizio Barbazza in fifth position, although he was closer to the pace than in previous events, driving the new AGS JH27 for the first time. Olivier Grouillard could only manage sixth place on this occasion for Fondmetal, his eighth pre-qualifying failure this season, and the Frenchman was sacked by the team after the Grand Prix weekend. Alex Caffi struggled again in the other Footwork in seventh place, his fourth failure in five pre-qualifying attempts, in contrast with his team-mate Alboreto. At the bottom of the time sheets, Pedro Chaves was unable to post a representative time at his home event in the Coloni, but the team announced it had been purchased by Italian shoe designer Andrea Sassetti.

Pre-qualifying classification

Qualifying report
Qualifying saw the top teams' second drivers beating the championship contenders. Riccardo Patrese took pole ahead of Gerhard Berger, with Ayrton Senna and Nigel Mansell third and fourth respectively. The top ten was rounded out by Alain Prost, Jean Alesi, Maurício Gugelmin, Pierluigi Martini, Ivan Capelli, and Michael Schumacher, the Benetton team a little off their usual pace.

Qualifying classification

Race

Race report
On Sunday Morning Prost's Ferrari had a rather dramatic blowup in the warmup, and the Frenchman had to start the race in the spare car. The start was very eventful with Patrese getting away well and with Mansell aggressively chopping across the front of Senna. Unimpressed, he tried to retake Mansell going into the first turn but Nigel held his line and then proceeded to sweep underneath Berger to grab second at the second corner. After lap 1 the order was Patrese, Mansell, Berger, Senna, and Alesi. Mansell seemed content to shadow Patrese until lap 18 when he slipstreamed past his teammate on the main straight and proceeded to pull away. Things were looking good for Williams until Mansell came in for his stop on lap 29 and disaster struck: a communications mix-up by the pit crew resulted in Mansell being sent off with the right rear wheel of his car not properly attached. The wheel rotated clean off and a frustrated Mansell was left stranded in the pit lane. In the heat of the moment, the crew scampered over to the car and fitted a fresh wheel outside of the pit box, a violation of the rules.

Mansell emerged in 17th place and started a charge through the field; he was up to sixth when he was finally shown the black disqualification flag on lap 51. He would, however, keep the fastest lap of the race, set on lap 43. The incident left Patrese comfortably in the lead from Berger and Senna, and Senna went second when Berger's engine blew on lap 37, he was followed out of the race by Prost's Ferrari, which also decided it had enough. On lap 40 the order was Patrese, Senna, Alesi, Martini, and Capelli, with the latter three being involved in an exciting battle for third place; Alesi didn't make errors despite being under pressure from the Minardi, and so the order remained unchanged until the late stages when the fifth placed Capelli suffered a front wing problem and ended up in the barriers, he came in the pits for a front wing change but retired only a lap later. Patrese cruised home to his second win of the season and fifth of his career. Senna was second and tightened the screw on his third drivers title. Alesi, Martini, Piquet, and Schumacher rounded out the top six. With three races to go Senna led Mansell by 24 points.

Race classification

Championship standings after the race

Drivers' Championship standings

Constructors' Championship standings

References

 

Portuguese Grand Prix
Portuguese Grand Prix
Grand Prix